Lorna Doone is a 1990 British drama television film directed by Andrew Grieve and starring Polly Walker, Sean Bean and Clive Owen. It is based on the 1869 novel Lorna Doone by R.D. Blackmore set in the West Country during Monmouth's Rebellion. It was made by Thames Television and aired on ITV.

Locations
Location filming took place near Glasgow in Scotland rather than the West Country, as producer Alan Horrox explained in The Spectator, "[the novel Lorna Doone] demands sweeping moorland vistas, plunging waterfalls, and a secret valley, as well as much else besides. When we researched the available locations on Exmoor, we discovered that much of the area has changed profoundly since the 17th-century setting of the original novel...I believe it could never successfully evoke the full-blooded dramatic sweep of this classic novel."

Plot
West country yeoman John Ridd (Clive Owen) vows to avenge the death of his father by destroying the land-grabbing Doone family. Then he meets, and immediately falls in love with, the beautiful and innocent Lorna Doone (Polly Walker).

Cast
John Ridd - 	Clive Owen
Carver Doone - 	Sean Bean
Lorna Doone - 	Polly Walker
Sarah Ridd - 	Billie Whitelaw
Tom Faggus - 	Miles Anderson
Judge Jeffreys - 	Kenneth Haigh
Annie Ridd - 	Jane Gurnett
Sir Ensor Doone - 	Robert Stephens
Ensie Doone - 	 Euan Grant Maclachlan
John Ridd's Father - 	Michael Mackenzie
Young John - 	 Andrew Ferguson
Young Lorna - 	 Claire Madden
Neighbour - 	Paul Young
Priest - 	 Martin Heller
Lady Dugal - 	Rachel Kempson
King James II - 	Hugh Fraser

Critical reception
Allmovie called it "one of the more rewarding film adaptations of the venerable R. D. Blackmore novel."

References

External links

British television films
1990 television films
1990 films
ITV television dramas
Films based on Lorna Doone
Television series by Fremantle (company)
Television shows produced by Thames Television
English-language television shows
Films directed by Andrew Grieve
1990s English-language films